Peter, Paul and Mary was an American folk group formed in New York City in 1961 during the American folk music revival phenomenon. The trio consisted of tenor Peter Yarrow, baritone Paul Stookey, and contralto Mary Travers.  The group's repertoire included songs written by Yarrow and Stookey, early songs by Bob Dylan, and covers of other folk musicians. They were enormously successful in the early- and mid-1960s, with their debut album topping the charts for weeks, and helped popularize the folk music revival. After the death of Travers in 2009, Yarrow and Stookey continued to perform as a duo under their individual names.

Mary Travers said she was influenced by Woody Guthrie, Pete Seeger, and the Weavers. In the documentary Peter, Paul & Mary: Carry It On — A Musical Legacy, members of the Weavers discuss how Peter, Paul and Mary took over the torch of the social commentary of folk music in the 1960s.

The group was inducted into the Vocal Group Hall of Fame in 1999. Peter, Paul and Mary received the Sammy Cahn Lifetime Achievement Award from the Songwriters Hall of Fame in 2006.

History

Early years and popularity (1961–1969)

Manager Albert Grossman created Peter, Paul and Mary in 1961, after auditioning several singers in the New York folk scene, including Dave Van Ronk, who was rejected as too idiosyncratic and uncommercial, and Carolyn Hester. After rehearsing Yarrow, Stookey and Travers out of town in Boston and Miami, Grossman booked them into The Bitter End, a coffee house, nightclub and popular folk music venue in New York City's Greenwich Village.

The group recorded their debut album, Peter, Paul and Mary, and it was released by Warner Bros. the following year. It included "Lemon Tree", "500 Miles", and the Pete Seeger hit tunes "If I Had a Hammer" (subtitled "The Hammer Song") and "Where Have All the Flowers Gone?" The album was listed in the Billboard Magazine Top Ten for 10 months, including seven weeks in the No. 1 position. It remained a main catalog-seller for decades to come, eventually selling over two million copies, earning double platinum certification from the RIAA in the United States alone.

In 1963 the group released "Puff, the Magic Dragon", with music by Yarrow and words based on a poem that had been written by a fellow student at Cornell, Leonard Lipton. Despite rumors that the song refers to drugs, it is actually about the lost innocence of childhood. That same year, they appeared as the "mystery guest" on the CBS TV game show What's My Line?; Dorothy Kilgallen correctly guessed their identity.

That year the group performed "If I Had a Hammer" and "Blowin' in the Wind" at the August 1963 March on Washington for Jobs and Freedom, best remembered for Martin Luther King Jr.'s "I Have a Dream" speech. The Bob Dylan song "Blowin' in the Wind" was one of their biggest hit singles. They also sang other Dylan songs, such as "The Times They Are a-Changin'", "Don't Think Twice, It's All Right", and "When the Ship Comes In". Their success with Dylan's "Don't Think Twice, It's All Right" helped Dylan's The Freewheelin' Bob Dylan album rise into the top 30; it had been released four months earlier.

In December 1969 "Leaving on a Jet Plane", written by the group's friend John Denver, became their only No. 1 single (as well as their final top 40 pop hit) and the group's sixth million-selling gold single. The track first appeared on their million-selling platinum certified Album 1700 in 1967 (which also contained their No. 9 hit "I Dig Rock and Roll Music"). After Eugene McCarthy's strong showing in the 1968 New Hampshire presidential primary, the group recorded "Eugene McCarthy For President (If You Love Your Country)" endorsing McCarthy, which was released without a record label.  "Day Is Done", a No. 21 hit in June 1969 from the trio's Grammy Award-winning album Peter, Paul and Mommy, was the last Hot 100 hit the trio recorded.

Breakup (1970–1978)
The trio broke up in 1970 to pursue solo careers. Also that year, Yarrow was convicted of making sexual advances toward a 14-year-old girl. Years later, he received a presidential pardon from Jimmy Carter.

During 1971 and 1972 Warner released a debut solo album, with the same style cover, by each member of the group. Travers did concerts and lectures across the United States. She also produced, wrote, and starred in a BBC-TV series. Stookey formed a Christian music group, the Body Works Band, and wrote "The Wedding Song (There Is Love)" for Yarrow's marriage to Marybeth McCarthy, the niece of Eugene McCarthy. Britain's Petula Clark also recorded a version of the song, which in 1973 charted strongly in the UK, Australia and others. Yarrow co-wrote and produced Mary MacGregor's Torn Between Two Lovers (No. 1, 1977) and earned an Emmy for three animated TV specials based on "Puff the Magic Dragon". 

While the group was de facto broken up and touring separately, it still managed to come together for a series of reunions before officially coming back together again. In 1972, the trio reunited for Together for McGovern, a concert at Madison Square Garden to support George McGovern's presidential campaign, and again in 1978 for a concert to protest nuclear energy. This concert was followed by a 1978 summer reunion tour, including a September 3 evening performance at Red Rocks Amphitheatre.   An album, Reunion, was released by Warner in 1978.

Reunion (1981–2009)

Their 1978 summer reunion tour was so popular that the group decided to reunite more or less permanently in 1981. They continued to record albums and tour, playing around 45 shows a year, until Travers's 2009 death.  After their reunion, double-bassist Dick Kniss (who had been their bassist in their studio recordings and with their 1960s tours) rejoined the group.  Starting in 1990, multi-instrumentalist Paul Prestopino also joined the group.

According to the flow of the times, they derived a way to change the lyrics of their songs; boys in the ”Puff” became boys and girls, and dark side in the ”Don't Think Twice, It's All Right" became black side. Some of their new songs, like "Don't Go Down To The Quarry" that criticizes an evil bet, continue the tradition of protest songs. The trio received the Peace Abbey Courage of Conscience award on September 1, 1990.

In 2004, Travers was diagnosed with leukemia, leading to the cancellation of that year's remaining tour dates. She received a bone marrow transplant. She and the rest of the trio resumed their tour on December 9, 2005, with a holiday performance at Carnegie Hall.

The trio canceled several dates of their summer 2007 tour, as Travers had to undergo a second surgery. She was unable to perform on the trio's tour in mid-2009 because of the effects of leukemia, but Yarrow and Stookey performed the scheduled dates as a duo, calling the show "Peter & Paul Celebrate Mary and 5 Decades of Friendship".

On September 16, 2009, Travers died at age 72, of complications from chemotherapy, following treatment for leukemia. It was the same year Peter, Paul and Mary were inducted into the Hit Parade Hall of Fame.

Discography

 Peter, Paul and Mary (1962)
 Moving (1963)
 In the Wind (1963)
 A Song Will Rise (1964)
 See What Tomorrow Brings (1965)
 The Peter, Paul and Mary Album (1966)
 Album 1700 (1967)
 Late Again (1968)
 Peter, Paul and Mommy (1969)
 Reunion (1978)
 No Easy Walk to Freedom (1986)
 Flowers and Stones (1990)
 LifeLines (1995)
 In These Times (2003)

See also
List of number-one hits (United States)
List of artists who reached number one on the Hot 100 (U.S.)

References

External links
Official home page
 Peter, Paul and Mary - Vocal Group Hall of Fame Page.

Peter Yarrow Interview NAMM Oral History Library (2017)

Musical groups established in 1961
Musical groups disestablished in 1970
Musical groups reestablished in 1978
Musical groups disestablished in 2009
American folk musical groups
Grammy Award winners
American musical trios
Warner Records artists
Musical groups from New York City
1961 establishments in New York City
1970 disestablishments in New York (state)
1978 establishments in New York City
2009 disestablishments in New York (state)